Kfar Yedidia (lit. Yedidia Village) is a moshav in central Israel on the coastal plain. With an area of 3,000 dunams, it falls under the jurisdiction of Hefer Valley Regional Council.

History
Kfar Yedidia was planned by Richard Kauffmann. It was founded on 9 April 1935 by Jewish refugees from Germany. Funding came from Jews in Alexandria, Kingdom of Egypt. The place was named for Philo of Alexandria, known in Hebrew as Yedidia.

References

German-Jewish culture in Israel
Moshavim
Populated places established in 1935
Populated places in Central District (Israel)
1935 establishments in Mandatory Palestine